Murdoch Maxwell MacOdrum (May 30, 1901 – August 1, 1955) was the second president of Carleton College (later Carleton University) in Ottawa, Ontario. Born in Nova Scotia, MacOdrum got his B.A. from Dalhousie University in 1923, his MA in 1925 from McGill and a PhD in English from the University of Edinburgh. In 1935 he was ordained as a Presbyterian minister in Sydney, N.S., where he ministered for four years.

After a stint at the Dominion Coal and Steel Co. in Sydney, MacOdrum came to Ottawa in 1944 to sell war bonds. There he was recruited by Carleton College's founder and president, Henry Marshall Tory, to be his executive assistant and eventual successor. MacOdrum became president upon Tory's death in 1947.

MacOdrum successfully lobbied the Ontario government to give the young but as-yet-unrecognized college a charter and degree-granting powers, which it got in 1952. He also oversaw many of the land deals that would eventually lead to Carleton's move to a new Rideau River campus in 1958, though he died three years before that move actually took place. In his honour, the second building on the new campus was named the Maxwell MacOdrum Library. He died of a heart attack in 1955.

Upon his death, MacOdrum was succeeded by acting president James Alexander Gibson.

Further reading
Blair Neatby and Don McEown, Creating Carleton: The Shaping of a University (McGill-Queen's University Press, 2002).
MacOdrum, Murdock Maxwell. Survivals of English and Scottish popular ballads in Nova Scotia : a study of folk song in Canada Montreal :  McGill University,  1924. 139 leaves ; 28 cm.

References

External links
 Maxwell MacOdrum Library, Carleton University.

Presidents of Carleton University
People from Nova Scotia
Canadian Presbyterian ministers
Canadian people of Scottish descent
Canadian Presbyterians
Dalhousie University alumni
Alumni of the University of Edinburgh
1901 births
1955 deaths